Branislav Kubala Daučík (10 January 1949 – 25 February 2018) was a Spanish professional footballer who played as a striker.

Early and personal life
Kubala was born in Šahy, Czechoslovakia, the eldest of three sons of László Kubala and Violeta Daučíkova. Violeta was the sister of Ferdinand Daučík and the aunt of Yanko Daucik. The family moved to Barcelona, Spain soon after his birth.

Career
Kubala spent time with the Real Betis youth team in 1961, before joining the AC Milan academy in Italy, where he spent two seasons. Upon his return to Barcelona he played with Espanyol, making his professional debut on 3 April 1965 at the age of 16 years 83 days, a league record for the youngest player. After one further appearance, he then played for Sabadell, before moving to North America with his family, where he played for the Toronto Falcons, the St. Louis Stars, and the Dallas Tornado. After returning to Spain to undertake military service, he played for Cartagena, Sant Andreu and Atlético Malagueño, before retiring at the age of 24.

Later life and death
He died on 25 February 2018.

References

1949 births
2018 deaths
People from Šahy
Sportspeople from the Nitra Region
Czechoslovak emigrants to Spain
Spanish footballers
Real Betis players
A.C. Milan players
RCD Espanyol footballers
CE Sabadell FC footballers
Toronto Falcons (1967–68) players
St. Louis Stars (soccer) players
Dallas Tornado players
Cartagena FC players
UE Sant Andreu footballers
Atlético Malagueño players
La Liga players
National Professional Soccer League (1967) players
North American Soccer League (1968–1984) players
Association football forwards
Spanish expatriate footballers
Spanish expatriate sportspeople in Italy
Expatriate footballers in Italy
Spanish expatriate sportspeople in Canada
Expatriate soccer players in Canada
Spanish expatriate sportspeople in the United States
Expatriate soccer players in the United States
Spanish people of Slovak descent
Catalonia international footballers